Stamper is a surname. Notable people with the surname include:

 Dave Stamper (1883–1963), American composer and songwriter
 Harold Stamper (1889–1939), English football (soccer) player
 Henry Stamper (1937–2009), Scottish actor, e.g., who played Hugh Allan in two episodes of The National Dream: Building the Impossible Railway
 Jay Stamper (ne Jeremy Stamper, 1972), American entrepreneur
 John Stamper (1926–2003), British aeronautical engineer
 Kory Stamper, lexicographer and former associate editor for the Merriam-Webster family of dictionaries
 Malcolm T. Stamper (1925–2005), president of Boeing
 Norm Stamper (born 1944), American police officer and writer
 Ronald Stamper (born 1934), British computer scientist
 Scott Stamper (American football), running back for the San Antonio Gunslingers in the USFL
 Scott Stamper (born 1962), owner of The Saint music venue, and founder of Asbury Park Music Awards and Wave Gathering 
 Stamper brothers (Tim and Chris), co-founders of Ultimate Play the Game and the company Rare
 Teresa Stamper, the subject of an Unsolved Mysteries episode and its crime drama television film adaptation, Escape from Terror: The Teresa Stamper Story (1995)
 Will Stamper, a web and media designer for Newgrounds

Fictional characters
 Doug Stamper. a character in the U.S. Netflix series, House of Cards 
 Hank Stamper, a character in Ken Kesey's second novel, Sometimes a Great Notion (1964)
 Tim Stamper (fictional character), a character in the House of Cards trilogy

See also 
 Stamper site, an archaeological site in rural Texas County, Oklahoma, USA
 Stampers Creek Township, Orange County, Indiana 
 Stamperland, a neighbourhood in Clarkston, East Renfrewshire, Scotland